Charles Goodwin Bennett (December 11, 1863 – May 25, 1914) was an American politician and a U.S. Representative from New York.

Biography
Born in Brooklyn, New York, Bennett was the son of George C. Bennett and attended the public schools. He graduated from Brooklyn High School, and from New York Law School in 1882. He was admitted to the bar in 1882, commenced practice in Brooklyn. He married Marie Louise Floyd-Smith, who died in 1913. He subsequently married Marguerite Tennan in 1914.

Career
Bennett was an unsuccessful candidate for election in 1892 to the Fifty-third Congress.

Elected as a Republican to the Fifty-fourth and Fifty-fifth Congresses, Bennett served as U. S. Representative for the fifth district of New York from March 4, 1895, to March 4, 1899.  He was an unsuccessful candidate for reelection to the Fifty-sixth Congress in 1898.

Bennett was Secretary of the United States Senate from January 29, 1900, to March 4, 1913, when a successor was elected. He returned to Brooklyn, ended active business pursuits, and lived the rest of his life in retirement.

Death
Bennett died in Brooklyn, Kings County, New York, on May 25, 1914 (age 50 years, 165 days). He is interred at The Evergreens Cemetery, Brooklyn, New York.

References

External links
 

1863 births
1914 deaths
New York Law School alumni
Lawyers from Brooklyn
Politicians from Brooklyn
Secretaries of the United States Senate
Republican Party members of the United States House of Representatives from New York (state)
19th-century American politicians
19th-century American lawyers